Manolita Piña Torres-Garcia (née Rubies 24 February 1883 – 11 June 1994) was the Catalan wife of Joaquín Torres García. She was known as "Doña Manolita" in Uruguay. She was considered to be an "inseparable companion" to Torres García, accompanied him to conferences, exhibitions and supported all of his artistic endeavors. In many ways, she was "like his shadow." Founder of the museum, the Museo Torres Garcia in Montevideo.

Biography 
Piña Torres was born in Barcelona, Spain on 24 February 1883 and died in Montevideo on 11 June 1994. Piña Torres was classically educated by her wealthy parents and she played piano into her late years.

She married Joaquín Torres García on 20 August 1908 in Barcelona. She and her husband lived in Europe , New York and in Montevideo in 1934.

Piña Torres's art, along with her husband's, has been collected by Emilio Ellena. Ellena describes her art as creative and beautiful, but Piña Torres stopped painting after she was married. Piña Torres states that she stopped painting so that she would not become a better painter than her husband or disturb his work, which would have been shameful to their family during her time and in her culture. She felt that although she had stopped painting herself, that her opinion on art was always welcome. She may have continued to do some art, since there is a record of a master quality woodcut in a book, Notes on Art by Torres Garcia (1913).

She says that politics were one of the few things she argued about with her husband. She was known to help artists who were suffering from political persecution. Two of her grandchildren were imprisoned and in exile and her home was searched for them. Piña Torres also refused to move back to Barcelona because of the crimes against art that were committed there, such as destroying frescoes.

Legacy 
In 1951, Piña Torres created a group in Montevideo, called MAOTIMA (standing for the names of the participants, Manolita, Otilia, Iphigenia and Maria Angelica) which was dedicated to working on embroidered tapestries.

Piňa Torres was a tireless collector of her husband's work and later helped promote much of his formerly unseen art. She also inventoried his work, a list of over 350 pieces of art. Piña Torres felt that after her husband's death, she should ensure his legacy and therefore created a museum dedicated to her husband's art and legacy which she accomplished at age 106. Piña Torres set up the foundation to support the Museo Torres Garcia and helped found the museum which was initially opened on 29 July 1953. The museum went through a long, difficult history until the government of Uruguay stabilized and the museum was inaugurated in its current form in 1986. Piña Torres was credited with enthusiasm and strength in working towards the creation of the museum. In addition to creating the foundation and the museum, she also set up an archive to document his life's work. She was often a subject of portraiture for her husband and the subject of others'other's paintings, as well, including artist, Rafael Barradas.

She was honored in 2000 by the Cultural Center Foundation, Caixa Terrassa.

References

Further reading

External links 
 Biography of Manolita Pina  (in Spanish)
 Manolita Pina from the Museo Torres Garcia (in Spanish)

1883 births
1994 deaths
Painters from Barcelona
Uruguayan women artists
20th-century Uruguayan painters
20th-century Uruguayan women artists
Spanish centenarians
Uruguayan supercentenarians
Women supercentenarians
Spanish emigrants to Uruguay
20th-century Spanish painters
20th-century Spanish women artists